The TCA Award for Outstanding Achievement in Comedy is an award given by the Television Critics Association.

Winners and nominees

Multiple wins

3 wins
 Frasier (consecutive)

2 wins
 Arrested Development (consecutive)
 The Big Bang Theory
 The Cosby Show (consecutive)
 The Larry Sanders Show (consecutive)
 Louie
 Malcolm in the Middle (consecutive)
 Modern Family (consecutive)
 Murphy Brown
 The Office (US) (consecutive)
 Seinfeld (consecutive)

Multiple nominees

7 nominations
 The Daily Show with Jon Stewart
 Everybody Loves Raymond
 Seinfeld

6 nominations
 The Big Bang Theory
 Frasier
 The Larry Sanders Show
 The Simpsons

5 nominations
 Veep

4 nominations
 Cheers
 The Good Place
 Louie
 Murphy Brown
 The Office (U.S.)
 Parks and Recreation

3 nominations
 30 Rock
 Atlanta
 Barry
 Friends
 Modern Family
 Newhart
 Sex and the City
 The Wonder Years

2 nominations
 3rd Rock from the Sun
 Ally McBeal
 Arrested Development
 Black-ish
 Community
 The Cosby Show
 Curb Your Enthusiasm
 Fleabag
 Hacks
 Malcolm in the Middle
 The Marvelous Mrs. Maisel
 Master of None
 Northern Exposure
 The Office (U.K.)
 Roseanne
 Schitt's Creek
 Scrubs
 Ted Lasso
 Will & Grace

Total awards by network

 NBC – 23
 ABC – 6
 Fox – 6
 CBS – 4
 FX – 3
 HBO – 3
 Comedy Central – 2
 Amazon – 1
 Apple TV+ - 1
 Pop – 1
 Showtime – 1

Total nominations by network

 NBC – 57
 CBS – 28
 HBO – 24
 Fox – 20
 ABC – 16
 FX – 10
 Comedy Central – 9
 Netflix - 7
 Amazon – 5 
 HBO Max - 3
 Apple TV+ - 2
 BBC America - 2
 The CW - 2
 Pop – 2
 Showtime – 2
 FXX - 1
 Hulu - 2
 MTV - 1
 Peacock - 1
 Starz - 1
 UPN - 1
 The WB - 1

References

External links
 Official website

Comedy